Darshan Ashwin Trivedi is an Indian film director and academician best known for his contribution for Gujarati cinema. He is known for his movies Mrugtrushna, Mara Pappa Superhero, Lakiro and Keri. He is Adjunct faculty at MICA.

Early life 
Darshan Ashwin Trivedi was born on 4 August 1977 in Ahmedabad, India. He has done Master in Development Communications from Gujarat University and PhD from Gujarat National Law University. During his career he has worked with brands like Zoom (Indian TV channel), Reliance Broadcast Network, Moving Pixels, Neela Tele Films.

Career 
He started working with radio and television networks in the early years of his career. Darshan has worked with Sony Entertainment Television, Radio Mirchi , Zoom , Reliance Broadcast Network, Moving Pixels, Neela Tele Films. Darshan is the former founder of Gujarati film fraternity.

Darshan started teaching in MICA in 2007. He teaches Media & Entertainment management. He works as an adjunct faculty with MICA. Darshan is the editor of the Indian OTT Platforms Report published by MICA.

Darshan started his filmmaking career in 2018. His debut feature film Mrugtrushna is the first part of the trilogy. His second film Mara Pappa Superhero is written by Sahita Academy awarded writer Raam Mori. His third film Lakiro explores Jazz music for the first time in Gujarati cinema. His fourth film Keri stars Bollywood Actor Rohit Roy and Ahmedabad based Radio Jockey Devaki.

Filmography

Films

Awards and recognition 
 Golden Butterfly Award, 33rd International Film Festival for Children and Youth, Iran, Best Screenplay, Mrugtrushna, 2020
 20th Annual Tiburon International Film Festival, Best Children's Film, Mara Pappa Superhero, 2021

References

External links 

Living people
1977 births
Gujarati-language film directors
21st-century Indian film directors
Indian male screenwriters
Artists from Ahmedabad
Gujarati people
Film directors from Gujarat
Film producers from Gujarat